The Guard Island Light is a lighthouse on a small island near the entrance to the Tongass Narrows, in Clarence Strait in southeastern Alaska. The western entrance to the Behm Canal also lies nearby.

History

The lighthouse location was prioritized sixth in a 1901 study of 15 Alaska proposed sites.  It would assist shipping along Southeast Alaska's Inside Passage, at the north end of the Tongass Narrows, "one of the more difficult passages along the route" of Klondike Gold Rush-related shipping to Juneau and to Skagway.

Construction of the Guard Island Lighthouse began in the summer of 1903 and was completed by September 1904. The  wooden tower housed a fourth order Fresnel lens that produced a fixed white light. However, the wood used for Guard Island Light Station, as well as for several other Alaskan lighthouses, soon deteriorated in the harsh weather conditions. By the 1920s, all the lighthouses except Eldred Rock were falling apart, and in 1922, Congress authorized the reconstruction of Guard Island Light. In 1924, the dilapidated light tower was replaced with a new single-story rectangular tower of reinforced concrete. The station was automated by the Coast Guard in 1969.

The lighthouse was listed as a historic district on the National Register of Historic Places in 2004.  The listing includes one contributing building, one contributing structure, and one contributing site on a  area.

See also

List of lighthouses in the United States
National Register of Historic Places listings in Ketchikan Gateway Borough, Alaska

References

External links

 
 Lighthouse Friends — Guard Island Lighthouse
 

1904 establishments in Alaska
Historic districts on the National Register of Historic Places in Alaska
Lighthouses completed in 1904
Lighthouses completed in 1924
Lighthouses on the National Register of Historic Places in Alaska
Buildings and structures on the National Register of Historic Places in Ketchikan Gateway Borough, Alaska